The Jaisalmer–Jodhpur Express is an Express train belonging to North Western Railway zone that runs between  and  in India. It is currently being operated with 14809/14810 train numbers on a daily basis.

Service

The 14809/Jaisalmer–Jodhpur Express has an average speed of 48 km/hr and covers 299 km in 6h 15m. The 14810/Jodhpur–Jaisalmer Express has an average speed of 43 km/hr and covers 299 km in 7h.

Route and halts 

The important halts of the train are:

Coach composition

The train has standard ICF rakes with max speed of 110 kmph. The train consists of 18 coaches:

 1 AC III Tier
 2 Sleeper coaches
 12 General Unreserved
 2 Seating cum Luggage Rake

Traction

Both trains are hauled by an Abu Road Loco Shed-based WDP-4D diesel locomotive from Jodhpur to Jaisalmer and vice versa.

Direction reversal

The train reverses its direction 1 times:

See also 

 Jodhpur Junction railway station
 Jaisalmer railway station

Notes

References

External links 

 14809/Jaisalmer–Jodhpur Express India Rail Info
 14810/Jodhpur–Jaisalmer Express India Rail Info

Transport in Jodhpur
Transport in Jaisalmer
Express trains in India
Rail transport in Rajasthan